Borshchivka is a village in Izium Raion (district) in Kharkiv Oblast of eastern Ukraine, at about  south-east from the centre of Kharkiv city.

The settlement came under attack by Russian forces during the Russian invasion of Ukraine in 2022.

Demographics
The settlement had 1281 inhabitants in 2001, native language distribution as of the Ukrainian Census of 2001:
Ukrainian: 91.87%
Russian: 6.73%
 Belarusian: 0.23%
Greek: 0.23%
Romani: 0.27%
 other languages: 0.86%

References

Villages in Izium Raion